Edmond Jaloux (19 June 1878, Marseille – 22 August 1949, Lutry) was a French novelist, essayist, and critic. His works tended to be set in Paris or his native Provence. He was interested in German Romanticism and English writers. In 1936 he joined the Académie française. He died in Switzerland in 1949.

Bibliography 
 Une âme d'automne (1896)
 L’Agonie de l'amour (1899)
 Le Triomphe de la frivolité (1903)
 Les Sangsues (1904)
 Le Jeune Homme au masque (1905)
 L’École des mariages (1906)
 Le Démon de la vie (1908)
 Le Reste est silence (Prix Femina, 1909)
 L’Éventail de crêpe (1911)
 Fumées dans la campagne (1918)
 L’Incertaine (1918)
 Les Amours perdues (1919)
 Au-dessus de la ville (1920)
 Vous qui faites l'endormie (1920)
 La Fin d'un beau jour (1920)
 L’Escalier d'or (1922)
 Les Barricades mystérieuses (1922)
 Les Profondeurs de la mer (1922)
 L’Esprit des livres, 7 volumes (1922)

References
Encyclopedia Americana (United States: Encyclopedia Americana Corporation, 1969 edition), pg 669

External links 
 
 
 

1878 births
1949 deaths
19th-century French essayists
19th-century French male writers
19th-century French novelists
20th-century French essayists
20th-century French male writers
20th-century French novelists
Members of the Académie Française
Writers from Marseille
Prix Femina winners
French male essayists
French male novelists